Dospey Heights are the ice-free heights on Ray Promontory in the northwestern part of Byers Peninsula on Livingston Island in the South Shetland Islands, Antarctica.  Extending 6 km southeastwards from Essex Point and Start Point, and 2.6 km wide.  Rising to 265 m at Start Hill.

The feature is part of the Antarctic Specially Protected Area ASPA 126 Byers Peninsula, and is situated in one of its two restricted zones.

The heights are named after the settlement of Dospey in Rila Mountain, southwestern Bulgaria.

Location
British mapping in 1968, Spanish in 1991 and 1993 and Bulgarian in 2005 and 2009.

Maps
 Península Byers, Isla Livingston. Mapa topográfico a escala 1:25000. Madrid: Servicio Geográfico del Ejército, 1992. (Map image on p. 55 of the linked study)
 L.L. Ivanov et al. Antarctica: Livingston Island and Greenwich Island, South Shetland Islands. Scale 1:100000 topographic map. Sofia: Antarctic Place-names Commission of Bulgaria, 2005.
 L.L. Ivanov. Antarctica: Livingston Island and Greenwich, Robert, Snow and Smith Islands. Scale 1:120000 topographic map. Troyan: Manfred Wörner Foundation, 2010.  (First edition 2009. )
 South Shetland Islands: Livingston Island, Byers Peninsula. Scale 1:50000 satellite map. UK Antarctic Place-names Committee, 2010.
 Antarctic Digital Database (ADD). Scale 1:250000 topographic map of Antarctica. Scientific Committee on Antarctic Research (SCAR). Since 1993, regularly updated.
 L.L. Ivanov. Antarctica: Livingston Island and Smith Island. Scale 1:100000 topographic map. Manfred Wörner Foundation, 2017.

Notes

References
 Dospey Heights. SCAR Composite Gazetteer of Antarctica.
 Bulgarian Antarctic Gazetteer. Antarctic Place-names Commission. (details in Bulgarian, basic data in English)

External links
Dospey Heights. Copernix satellite image

Landforms of Livingston Island
Bulgaria and the Antarctic